Pythagoras was a freedman of the Roman emperor Nero, whom he allegedly married  in a public ceremony in which the emperor took the role of bride.

Life 

Little is known about Pythagoras' background except that he was a freedman who accompanied Nero.

Marriage to Nero 
In the year 64, during the Saturnalia, Tigellinus offered a series of banquets to Nero, after a few days of which Nero performed a marriage to Pythagoras:

Doryphorus 
Suetonius tells the story of Nero's being the bride to a freedman named "Doryphorus". Both Tacitus and Dio Cassius mention only "Pythagoras". According to Champlin, it is improbable that a second such scandalous wedding occurred without being noted, and the simplest solution is that Suetonius mistook the name. Doryphorus, one of the wealthiest and most powerful of Nero's freedmen, died in the year 62 before the banquets of Tigellinus, where Nero, covered with skins of wild animals, was let loose from a cage and attacked the private parts of men and women bound to stakes, after which he was dispatched by his freedman "Doryphorus". As "doryphoros" means "spear bearer" (Δορυφόρος) like the statue, it may be that the latinized word had just capitalized the Greek word.

Bibliography

 Suetonius. Nero. 29

See also
History of same-sex unions
Homosexuality in ancient Rome
Sporus

References

1st-century births
1st-century deaths
1st-century Romans
Emperor's slaves and freedmen
Italian LGBT people
Spouses of Nero
Husbands of Roman emperors
Ancient LGBT people